Out of Sync may refer to:
 Out-of-Sync, 1995 American film;
 Out of Sync (book), 2007 autobiographical book;
 Out of Sync (film), 2021 Spanish-Lithuanian-French film.